UEI College is a private for-profit career college with locations in the U.S. states of California, Washington, Arizona, and Georgia. It specializes in short-term technical and vocational education to prepare students for entry-level positions in industries such as healthcare, business, and skilled trades. UEI College is owned by International Education Corporation. The school was founded in 1982 as United Education Institute and changed its name to UEI College in 2009.

Accreditation 
UEI Colleges in Huntington Park, Anaheim, Chula Vista, West Covina, Encino, Ontario, San Marcos, Stockton, Phoenix, and Morrow are accredited by Accrediting Council for Continuing Education and Training (ACCET). The Bakersfield, Gardena, Fresno, Sacramento and Riverside locations are accredited by the Accrediting Commission of Career Schools and Colleges (ACCSC).

References

External links
 

Educational institutions established in 1982
Education in California
1982 establishments in California